"You Ain't Seen Nothing Yet" is a song by Canadian rock band Bachman–Turner Overdrive (BTO). The song was written by Randy Bachman for the band's third studio album Not Fragile (1974). It was released as a single in 1974, with an instrumental track "Free Wheelin'" as the B-side. It reached the number one position on the Billboard Hot 100 singles chart and the Canadian RPM chart the week of November 9, 1974, as well as earning the band their only major hit single in the United Kingdom, peaking at number 2 on the UK Singles Chart. The follow-up single, "Roll on Down the Highway", was also a minor UK hit.

Theme
The lyrics for the song tell of the narrator meeting a "devil woman" who gives him love. The chorus of the song includes the song's famous stutter, and speaks of her looking at him with big brown eyes and saying, "You ain't seen nothin' yet. B-b-b-baby, you just ain't seen na-na-nothin' yet. Here's somethin' that you're never gonna forget. B-b-b-baby, you just ain't seen na-na-nothin' yet."

Development
"You Ain't Seen Nothing Yet" was written by Randy Bachman. In The Rolling Stone Record Guide, writer Dave Marsh called the song "a direct steal from The Who", but "an imaginative one". The chords of the chorus riff are very similar to the ones used by the Who in their song "Baba O'Riley", and also the stuttering vocal is reminiscent of "My Generation". Bachman insists that the song was performed as a joke for his brother, Gary, who had a stutter, with no intention of sounding like "My Generation". They only intended to record it once with the stutter and send the only recording to Gary.

Bachman developed the song while recording BTO's third album, Not Fragile (1974). It began as an instrumental piece inspired by the rhythm guitar on Dave Mason's "Only You Know and I Know". Bachman says "it was basically just an instrumental and I was fooling around... I wrote the lyrics, out of the blue, and stuttered them through." The band typically used the song as a "work track" in the studio to get the amplifiers and microphones set properly.

But when winding up production for the album, Charlie Fach of Mercury Records said the eight tracks they had lacked the "magic" that would make a hit single. Some band members asked Bachman, "what about the work track?" Bachman reluctantly mentioned that he had this ninth song, but did not intend to use it on a record. He said, "We have this one song, but it's a joke. I'm laughing at the end. I sang it on the first take. It's sharp, it's flat, I'm stuttering to do this thing for my brother."

Fach asked to hear it, and they played the recording for him. Fach smiled and said "That's the track. It's got a brightness to it. It kind of floats a foot higher than the other songs when you listen to it."

Bachman agreed to rearrange the album sequence so the song could be added, but only if he could re-record the vocals first, without the stutter. Fach agreed, but Bachman says "I tried to sing it normal, but I sounded like Frank Sinatra. It didn't fit." Fach said to leave it as it was, with the stutter.

Reception
Billboard described "You Ain't Seen Nothing Yet" as a "basic rocker featuring licks reminiscent of the Velvet Underground's 'Sweet Jane'," and praised the melodies and the vocal hook.  Cash Box said that "this simply super rocker with a perfect hook is a rock experience that is not to be missed" and that it is "one of the best rockers of the year". Record World said that "Comin' on like a cross between 'My Generation' and 'Pinball Wizard,' this is the tune to break BTO into the Who-fashioned stratosphere of top rockdom."

While not originally intended to be a single, "You Ain't Seen Nothing Yet" was becoming a hit as an album cut. Radio stations all over the USA were giving it a great deal of airplay, as Not Fragile (1974) was soaring up the album charts—so much so that Bachman was embarrassed because he thought it was a stupid song, just something that he wrote as a joke.

With no singles yet released from the Not Fragile album, Fach would regularly call Bachman with airplay reports, asking for permission to release "You Ain't Seen Nothing Yet". Bachman said, "And I refused for three weeks. I was producer, so I had final say on what went out. I woke up one day and asked myself, 'Why am I stopping this?' Some of my favorite records are really dumb things like 'Louie, Louie'...so I said to Charlie, 'O.K., release it. I bet it does nothing.'"

"You Ain't Seen Nothing Yet" debuted at number 65 on September 21, 1974, and reached the top of the Hot 100 seven weeks later. It was the only US number 1 single in BTO's history. (While in the Guess Who, Bachman had penned one other US chart-topper, "American Woman", which hit number 1 in 1970.)

"You Ain't Seen Nothing Yet" also holds the record for falling farthest on the chart before returning to the Top 10. After falling to number 34 two weeks after being in the number 1 spot, it jumped back to number 8 for two weeks, largely because of interest in the flip side, an instrumental called "Free Wheelin'". The song is not listed in Billboard's Top 100 singles of 1974 despite having reached number 1 within the time period covered by the chart, and is listed as the number 98 song of 1975. Its absence from the 1974 list and low placing on the 1975 list is due to its rapid ascent to number 1 and rapid descent from number 1 before re-peaking at number 8, meaning its chart points were not focused within either the 1974 or 1975 chart periods.

In Canada, the single also reached number 1 and won the 1976 Juno Award for best-selling single.

In the UK it reached number 2, kept off the top of the charts by "Lonely This Christmas" by Mud. It was later introduced to a new generation of fans in the UK when a remixed version was used as the theme tune to the ITV network's coverage of Formula One grand prix motor racing between 2003 and 2005, resulting in increased radio airplay for the original song in the UK during that period.

Uses in popular culture
BTO's version appears in a 2019 and 2022 TV commercials for Applebee's, and prominently features in the 2012 film comedy The Watch.

It was the favourite record played by Smashie and Nicey on Harry Enfield's Television Programme, a BBC TV comedy show.

The song was used for an episode of The Drew Carey Show called "The Dog and Pony Show". After an unfortunate misunderstanding results in the dog of Drew's boss being accidentally neutered, he comes up with a plan to replace the dog: he, Oswald, Lewis, Mr. Wick and Larry Almada will strip to "You Ain't Seen Nothing Yet".

The song was also used in the trailer for Barnyard (2006).

Snake sings it in season 5 episode 15 of Degrassi: The Next Generation, “Our Lips Are Sealed, Part 1”.

Charts

Weekly charts

Year-end charts

Cover versions 

In 1989, American band Figures on a Beach released a cover version which reached number 67 on the Billboard Hot 100.

Finnish band Moogetmoogs released a cover version of "You Ain't Seen Nothing Yet" (re-titled "Kolmen minuutin muna") as the second single from their 1991 album Kadonnut levy ("The Lost Record"), with a cover version of The Contours song "Do You Love Me" (retitled "Klu klu (mua rakastatko)?") as its B-side. Released in 1991, the single started to receive significant airplay and media attention beginning in November and hit number 1 on the Finnish charts in February 1992. The Finnish lyrics were written by lead singer Moog Konttinen; "Kolmen minuutin muna" translates to "three-minute egg" but can be interpreted as a euphemism for premature ejaculation too.

Burton Cummings, Randy Bachman's former bandmate in the Guess Who, did a jazzy version on his first solo record.

Figures on a Beach scored a minor hit in 1989 with their version of the song. It has also been covered by John Otway, ApologetiX (1999), Yo La Tengo (2006), The Disco Boys (2006) and Dutch band Oôs Joôs who retitled it "Bier En Zwere Sjek" (2008).

See also
List of Hot 100 number-one singles of 1974 (U.S.)
List of number-one hits of 1975 (Germany)
List of number-one singles of 1992 (Finland)
 "You ain't heard nothing yet!", a catchphrase popularized by Al Jolson, also used in the movie The Jazz Singer

References

1974 singles
Bachman–Turner Overdrive songs
Billboard Hot 100 number-one singles
Cashbox number-one singles
Number-one singles in Denmark
Number-one singles in Germany
Number-one singles in New Zealand
RPM Top Singles number-one singles
Number-one singles in South Africa
Songs written by Randy Bachman
1974 songs
Mercury Records singles
Juno Award for Single of the Year singles